Elections to City of Bradford Metropolitan District Council were held on 4 May 1978, with one third of council up for election as well as an extra vacancy in Shipley: Central, North & East. The election resulted in the Conservatives retaining control with voter turnout at 38.3%.

Election result

This result had the following consequences for the total number of seats on the council after the elections:

Ward results

References

1978 English local elections
1978
1970s in West Yorkshire